George Lloyd Murphy (July 4, 1902 – May 3, 1992) was an American dancer, actor, and politician. Murphy was a song-and-dance leading man in many big-budget Hollywood musicals from 1930 to 1952. He was the president of the Screen Actors Guild from 1944 to 1946, and was awarded an honorary Oscar in 1951. Murphy served from 1965 to 1971 as U.S. Senator from California, the first notable American actor to be elected to statewide office in California, predating Ronald Reagan and Arnold Schwarzenegger, who each served two terms as governor.  He is the only United States Senator represented by a star on the Hollywood Walk of Fame.

Early life
Murphy was born in New Haven, Connecticut, of Irish Catholic extraction, the son of Michael Charles "Mike" Murphy, athletic trainer and coach, and the former Nora Long. He was educated at Trinity-Pawling School, Peddie School and Yale University in his native New Haven. He worked as a tool maker for the Ford Motor Company, as a miner, a real estate agent, and a night club dancer.

Film career

In movies, Murphy was known as a song-and-dance man and appeared in many big-budget musicals such as Broadway Melody of 1938 (1937), Broadway Melody of 1940 (1940) and For Me and My Gal (1942). He made his movie debut shortly after talking pictures had replaced silent movies in 1930, and his career continued until he retired as an actor in 1952, at the age of 50.  During World War II, he organized entertainment for American troops.

In 1951, he was awarded an honorary Academy Award. He was never nominated for an Oscar in any competitive category.

He was the president of the Screen Actors Guild from 1944 to 1946. He was also a vice president of Desilu Productions and of the Technicolor Corporation. He was director of entertainment for presidential inaugurations in 1953, 1957 and 1961.

Political career

Murphy entered politics in 1952 by joining the leadership of the California Republican Party, having also directed the entertainment for the Eisenhower-Nixon inauguration that same year.

In 1964, he was elected as a Republican to the Senate, having defeated Pierre Salinger, the former presidential press secretary in the Kennedy White House, who had been appointed several months earlier to serve the remainder of the late Clair Engle's unexpired term. Murphy served from January 1, 1965, to January 3, 1971. Murphy assumed his seat two days early, when Salinger resigned from the seat to allow Murphy to gain an edge in seniority. Murphy was then appointed by Democratic Governor Pat Brown to serve the remaining two days of Salinger's term.

Murphy was in demand for a time to assist other Republican candidates seeking office. In 1966, he hosted a fundraising dinner in Atlanta, for U.S. Representative Howard "Bo" Callaway, the first Republican candidate for Governor of Georgia since Reconstruction. In the election, Callaway outpolled Democrat Lester Maddox, but did not get a majority, and the state legislature elected Maddox.

In 1967 and 1968, Murphy was the chairman of the National Republican Senatorial Committee. During his Senate term, Murphy developed throat cancer, and part of his larynx had to be removed. For the rest of his life, he was unable to speak above a whisper.

Murphy voted in favor of the Voting Rights Act of 1965, as well as the confirmation of Thurgood Marshall to the U.S. Supreme Court, and the Civil Rights Act of 1968.

In 1970, Murphy ran for re-election; he was challenged by Democratic US Representative John V. Tunney, the son of famed heavyweight boxing champion Gene Tunney. Murphy's surgery and staunch support for the lingering Vietnam War worked against him, as did reports that he had continued to receive a salary from Technicolor after taking office. Tunney's successful Senate race in 1970 was reportedly the inspiration for the 1972 Robert Redford film The Candidate.

Death
Murphy subsequently moved to Palm Beach, Florida, where he died at the age of 89, from leukemia.

Legacy
Murphy's move from the screen to California politics paved the way for the successful transitions of actors such as Ronald Reagan and later Arnold Schwarzenegger. Reagan once famously referred to George Murphy as his own "John the Baptist".

Fellow Republicans praised Murphy's ability to speak at fundraising dinners and so consequently backed his bid to become the chairman of the Senate Republican Campaign Committee.

During his tenure in the Senate, Murphy created the candy desk by placing a supply of confectionery on his desk on the U.S. Senate floor. After 1971, the candy-desk duties were bequeathed to a string of successors; as of 2023, the keeper of the candy desk is Indiana Republican Todd Young.

Murphy was the subject of a song by Tom Lehrer included on his album That Was the Year That Was with the same name, which criticized Murphy's comments about Mexicans working in the US.

Personal life
Murphy was married to his ballroom dancing partner, Juliette "Julie" Henkel-Johnson, from December 18, 1926, until her death, in 1973. They had two children: Dennis Michael Murphy and Melissa Elaine Murphy.

He was married to Bette Blandi from 1982 until his death in 1992; she died in 1999.

Radio
 Suspense (episode "Death on Highway 99" 1945)
 Lux Radio Theatre (episode Royal Wedding 1952)

Films

 Kid Millions (1934) as Jerry Lane
 Jealousy (1934) as Larry O'Roarke
 I'll Love You Always (1935) as Carl Brent
 After the Dance (1935) as Jerry Davis
 The Public Menace (1935) as Edward Joseph 'Red' Foster
 Woman Trap (1936) as Keat Shevlin
 Top of the Town (1937) as Ted Lane
 London by Night (1937) as Michael Denis
 Broadway Melody of 1938 (1937) as Sonny Ledford
 The Women Men Marry (1937) as Bill Raeburn
 You're a Sweetheart (1937) as Hal Adams
 Little Miss Broadway (1938) as Roger Wendling
 Letter of Introduction (1938) as Barry Paige
 Hold That Co-ed (1938) as Rusty
 Risky Business (1939) as Dan Clifford
 Broadway Melody of 1940 (1940) as King Shaw
 Two Girls on Broadway (1940) as Eddie Kerns
 Public Deb No. 1 (1940) as Alan Blake
 Little Nellie Kelly (1940) as Jerry Kelly
 A Girl, a Guy, and a Gob (1941) as Coffee Cup
 Tom, Dick and Harry (1941) as Tom
 Ringside Maisie (1941) as Skeets Maguire
 Rise and Shine (1941) as Mo McGonigle
 The Mayor of 44th Street (1942) as Joe Jonathan
 For Me and My Gal (1942) as Mo K. Metcalf
 The Navy Comes Through (1942) as Lt. Thomas L. 'Tom' Sands
 The Powers Girl (1943) as Jerry Hendricks
 Bataan (1943) as Lieut. Steve Bentley
 This Is the Army (1943) as Jerry Jones
 Broadway Rhythm (1944) as Jonnie Demming
 Show Business (1944) as George Doane
 Step Lively (1944) as Gordon Miller
 Having Wonderful Crime (1945) as Jake Justus
 Up Goes Maisie (1946) as Joseph Morton
 The Arnelo Affair (1947) as Theodore 'Ted' Parkson
 Cynthia (1947) as Larry Bishop
 Tenth Avenue Angel (1948) as Steve Abbutt
 Big City  (1948) as Patrick O'Donnell
 Border Incident (1949) as Jack Bearnes
 Battleground (1949) as 'Pop' Stazak
 No Questions Asked (1951) as Inspector Matt Duggan
 It's a Big Country (1951) as Mr. Callaghan
 Talk About a Stranger (1952) as Robert Fontaine Sr.
 Walk East on Beacon (1952) as Inspector James 'Jim' Belden
 Deep in My Heart (1954) (scenes deleted)

References

External links

 
 
 Biographical Directory of the United States Congress
 Images of George Murphy's 1974 passport from www.passportland.com

|-

|-

|-

1902 births
1992 deaths
20th-century American dancers
20th-century American male actors
20th-century American politicians
Academy Honorary Award recipients
American actor-politicians
American male dancers
American male film actors
American miners
American people of Irish descent
American tap dancers
California Republicans
Candidates in the 1970 United States elections
Catholics from Connecticut
Catholics from Florida
Deaths from cancer in Florida
Deaths from leukemia
Florida Republicans
Male actors from New Haven, Connecticut
Metro-Goldwyn-Mayer contract players
Musicians from New Haven, Connecticut
New Right (United States)
Peddie School alumni
People from Palm Beach, Florida
Politicians from New Haven, Connecticut
Presidents of the Screen Actors Guild
Republican Party United States senators from California
University of Detroit Jesuit High School and Academy alumni